The concejos are a type of sub-municipal administrative unit in the province of Álava, Basque Country, Spain.

Within the Spanish legal framework, the general name for such sub-municipal units is minor local entity (formally in  also known by their acronym ).

The existence of concejos in Álava is documented since the 13th century. Their current status dates from 1984, when a law providing for elections to the concejos was passed; and from 1995, when their juridical status was clarified.

See also 

 Local government in Spain

Notes

References

External links 
 ACOA-AKE
 

Local government in Spain
Álava
Basque politics
